Cirmtuzumab (also UC-961) is an anti-ROR1 humanised monoclonal antibody.

It is an experimental drug in early-stage clinical trials for various cancers including chronic lymphocytic leukemia (CLL).

References

Monoclonal antibodies for tumors